"Someone like Me" is a song by British girl group Atomic Kitten. Released on 29 March 2004 as the third and final single from their third studio album, Ladies Night (2003), the piano-driven track was issued as a double A-side with "Right Now 2004", a remixed version of their debut single, "Right Now". With the group having announced their split prior to the song's release, it was originally intended to be released as their final single, though they later released a further three one-off singles in 2005 and two charity singles in 2006 and 2008. The group reformed officially in September 2012 without Jenny Frost, who was replaced with original member Kerry Katona.

Background
"Someone like Me" was written by Ciaron Bell and Liz McClarnon, and produced by Bell. A slight alteration was made to the song for the single release: on the album version of the song, Liz performs the opening and second verses of the song, but for the single version, her vocals were removed from the second verse and Jenny Frost's were added.

Chart performance
The song peaked on the UK Singles Chart at number eight, subsequently going on to sell 50,000 copies in the UK alone, making it a moderate success. The single was also a top 20 hit in Ireland, going straight in at number 18. In the Flanders region of Belgium, it reached number eight on the Ultratip chart. The single also charted in the Netherlands and Switzerland but did not make the top 40 in either.

Music video
The music video for "Someone like Me" features all three girls in white clothes in a room which is plain white. While Liz plays the piano to start of the video, the other two girls are seen lying down on a sofa, and then a view is shown of the girls from outside the room, by a door opening. The video was intended to be simple and basic, much like the video for "Whole Again".

Track listings

Charts

Weekly charts

Year-end charts

References

2004 singles
2004 songs
Atomic Kitten songs
Innocent Records singles
Songs written by Liz McClarnon
Virgin Records singles